KFMA (102.1 FM) is commercial radio station located in Tucson, Arizona, broadcasting to the Tucson, Arizona area.  KFMA airs an active rock music format. It runs the week day jumpstart with Riley week mornings. KFMA has an ERP of 100,000 watts.  Its studios are in northern Tucson while the transmitter is southeast of the city.

KFMA formerly broadcast on 92.1 MHz with a repeater on 101.3. The signal was sometimes hard to pick in all areas of the Tucson Metro Area due to distance, and the fact that the 92.1 frequency had an ERP of 50,000 watts. To overcome this, it has K267AF, a translator located in Tucson that broadcasts on 101.3, which in many parts of Tucson is much easier to hear. Nevertheless, Lotus Communications coordinated a frequency swap with 'KCMT' because the 92.1 frequency better served their target audience while the 102.1 frequency better served the target audience of 'KFMA'

History

Easy listening (1982-198?) 
In 1982 the station began using the calls KEZG, as a class A station, which aired easy listening and 'beautiful' music.

Top 40 (198?-1991) 
After changing hands in the mid-1980s it became KFXX, a top 40 station. In the early 1990s, the station was sold to Bill Yde, who eventually sold it Lotus Radio, its current owner.

Rock (1991-1993) 
Between October 15, 1991 and September 21, 1993, it was KTZN, which played a Rock and Adult Contemporary mix.

Adult alternative (1993-1995) 
KTZN then became 92.1 and 101.3 The Echo with the call letters KEKO. As the Echo, it was an adult album alternative station.

Alternative (1995-2014) 
In November 1995 the flip to KFMA and alternative rock was made. KFMA began streaming audio on the internet in 2003. Effective March 21, 2014 KFMA moved to 102.1 MHz.

Active rock (2014-present) 
In 2014, the station shifted to an active rock playlist using the name "Rock 102-1." From 2017-19, the station aired the syndicated Billy Madison Show in morning drive. Since then, the station has returned to local programming in mornings.

Awards
Tucson Weekly Best of Tucson: public-vote winner for its radio station category (usually Best Rock Station) every year since 1996 except once.

Logos

References

External links

FMA
Active rock radio stations in the United States
Radio stations established in 2001
2001 establishments in Arizona
Lotus Communications stations